Blastesthia is a genus of moths belonging to the subfamily Olethreutinae of the family Tortricidae.

Species
Blastesthia mughiana (Zeller, 1868)
Blastesthia posticana (Zetterstedt, 1839)
Blastesthia tessulatana (Staudinger, 1871)
Blastesthia turionella (Linnaeus, 1758)

Former species
Blastesthia fulvimitrana (Zetterstedt, 1839)
Blastesthia mulsantiana (Zetterstedt, 1839)

See also
List of Tortricidae genera

References

External links
tortricidae.com

Eucosmini
Tortricidae genera